The name Suncook may refer to a location in the United States:

The Suncook River in New Hampshire
The Suncook Lakes, at the head of the river
Suncook, New Hampshire, a village on the Suncook River
The USS Suncook (1865), a United States naval vessel